Vanguard School may refer to:

Canada 
 Vanguard College, a private Christian college in Edmonton, Alberta, Canada
 Vanguard School (Quebec), a private high school in Montreal, Quebec, Canada

New Zealand 
 Vanguard Military School, a charter school in Auckland, New Zealand

United States 
 Vanguard College Preparatory School, a private high school in Waco, Texas, U.S.
 Vanguard High School, a public high school in Ocala, Florida, U.S.
 Vanguard School (Illinois), a public high school in Arlington Heights, Illinois, U.S.
 Vanguard University of Southern California, a private Christian university in Costa Mesa, California, U.S.
 The Vanguard School (Colorado), a public K-12 charter school in Colorado Springs, Colorado, U.S.
 Vanguard School (Florida), a private boarding high school in Lake Wales, Florida, U.S.
 The Vanguard School (Pennsylvania), a private school in Malvern, Pennsylvania, U.S.
 Vanguard School of Coconut Grove, a private day school in Coconut Grove, Florida, U.S.
 Carnegie Vanguard High School, a public magnet high school in Houston, Texas, U.S.